Jeong Seung-hwa (정승화, 鄭昇和; 27 February 1929 – 12 June 2002) was a South Korean general officer, and the 22nd Republic of Korea Army Chief of Staff. He was present at the Blue House presidential compound, site of the assassination of President Park Chung-hee, when it took place on 26 October 1979.

Biography
Born on 27 February 1929 in Gimcheon, Jeong Seung-hwa joined the South Korean Army as a conscript in the 17th Regiment and fought at the Battle of Busan Perimeter. He later went to the Korea Military Academy and was commissioned as a lieutenant in the 26th Infantry Regiment in 1950, where he later commanded in the early 1960s. He then commanded a Mechanized Brigade and an Infantry Division, before being appointed as Commander of II Corps in 1976.

In 1978, Jeong was appointed Army Chief of Staff, the most dominant role in the South Korean military. On the evening of 26 October 1979, while Jeong was dining at the Blue House presidential compound, South Korean President Park Chung-hee was assassinated at another facility in the compound. The assassin, Kim Jae-gyu, immediately sought out Jeong with a view to having him take over the presidency.

Instead, an emergency cabinet meeting was convened at which Choi Kyu-hah, the prime minister, was declared acting president with Jeong implementing martial law. He plotted to exclude political soldiers such as the Hanahoe, an influential group of South Korean military officers. The group later instigated the Coup d'état of December Twelfth. As a result, key members of the Hanahoe, such as Chun Doo-hwan and Roh Tae-woo, arrested Jeong on suspicion of involvement in the assassination of Park.

As a punishment, Jeong was reduced in rank to private and sentenced to life imprisonment. In 1997, 17 years after the coup d'état, Jeong was cleared of any involvement in the death of Park by the Seoul District Court. He was restored to his general officer rank and received pay that had been forfeited at the time of his sentencing. He died on 12 June 2002 in Seoul.

See also 
 Chun Doo-hwan
 Roh Tae-woo
 Jang Tae-wan

Notes

References

1929 births
2002 deaths
Fourth Republic of Korea
Korean torture victims
Leaders ousted by a coup
South Korean politicians
South Korean generals
Korea Military Academy alumni
Chiefs of Staff of the Army (South Korea)
ROK Armed Forces prisoners of war in the Korean War